The 1915 St Austell by-election was held on 24 November 1915.  The by-election was held due to the incumbent Liberal MP, Thomas Agar-Robartes, dying of wounds sustained in the Battle of Loos in the First World War.  It was won by the Liberal candidate Sir Francis Layland-Barratt who was unopposed due to a War-time electoral pact.

References

1915 in England
1915 elections in the United Kingdom
By-elections to the Parliament of the United Kingdom in Cornish constituencies
Unopposed by-elections to the Parliament of the United Kingdom (need citation)
St Austell
1910s in Cornwall